Steal Ur Girlfriend is an Indian reality show aired on Channel[V], every Sunday at 7 pm. In the show the participants are helped by the host Kashmera Shah and the Channel V team in getting back with his or her lost love.

References
 http://www.startv.in/shows.asp?serialid=343&channel_id=8
 http://www.channelv.in/shows/stealurgirlfriend/

External links
 Official Steal ur Girlfriend Facebook Page

Indian drama television series